Content managed hosting is a service that couples website hosting with a content management system. Content management systems enable Web site owners or marketing departments to edit website content, share files, and hyperlink pages without needing to know markup or programming languages. It is an alternative to using an open-source content management system or purchasing an off-the-shelf system.

See also
Content Management Website

External links
Content Managed Hosting

Website management